The following highways are numbered 722:

Costa Rica
 National Route 722

United States
US
  Ohio State Route 722
  Pennsylvania Route 722

Territories
  Puerto Rico Highway 722